François Lemarchand (born 2 November 1960 in Livarot, France) is a former French cyclist, who during the 1980s and 1990s participated in ten Tours de France. He was a professional cyclist between 1985 and 1997.

External links

1960 births
Living people
French male cyclists
Sportspeople from Calvados (department)
Cyclists from Normandy